Earl John Hindman (October 20, 1942  – December 29, 2003) was an American actor, best known for his role as the kindly unseen neighbor Wilson W. Wilson, Jr. on the television sitcom Home Improvement (1991–99).

Early years
Hindman was born in Bisbee, Arizona, the son of Eula and Burl Latney Hindman, who worked in the oil pipeline business. He studied acting at the University of Arizona.

Career 
Hindman played villains in two 1974 thrillers, The Taking of Pelham One Two Three and The Parallax View. He also appeared in the films Who Killed Mary What's 'Er Name? (1971), Greased Lightning (1977), The Brink's Job (1978), Taps (1981), Murder in Coweta County (1983), and played the part of J.T. in the Lawrence Kasdan film Silverado (1985).

Hindman's most famous pre-Home Improvement role was as Bob Reid in Ryan's Hope. He played the role from 1975 to 1984 and later returned for its final episodes in 1988–89. Hindman's wife (Molly McGreevy) was also on the soap 1977–81 as Polly Longworth, best friend to media tycoon Rae Woodard.

Personal life and death
On May 21, 1976, Hindman married Molly McGreevy, with whom he later acted on Ryan's Hope. McGreevey later became an Episcopal priest.

Hindman died of lung cancer on December 29, 2003, at the age of 61, in Stamford, Connecticut.

Filmography

References

External links
 
 

1942 births
2003 deaths
20th-century American male actors
21st-century American male actors
American male film actors
American male soap opera actors
American male television actors
Burials in Connecticut
Deaths from cancer in Connecticut
Deaths from lung cancer
Male actors from Arizona
Male actors from Stamford, Connecticut
People from Bisbee, Arizona
University of Arizona alumni